Mirijam Contzen (born in 1976) is a German-Japanese violinist.

Life and career
Born in Münster, Contzen grew up in Lünen. She began her studies at the Musikhochschule Detmold in 1984 and from 1988 she was a master student of the violin teacher Tibor Varga (1921–2003) from Hungary. Since 2005 she has been artistic director of the annual International Chamber Music Festival Schloss Cappenberg, which takes place every summer at Cappenberg Castle. The 11th concert took place from 20 to 27 May 2018. Among other musicians were Herbert Schuch (piano), Tobias Bredohl (piano) and Sebastian Manz (clarinet).

References

External links 
 
 Mirijam Contzen Homepage
 

1976 births
Living people
People from Münster
German classical violinists
Women classical violinists
21st-century classical violinists